The fifth season of The Great Canadian Baking Show premiered on CBC Television on October 17, 2021. As with previous seasons, ten amateur bakers will compete over eight weeks of challenges, vying for the title. Ann Pornel and Alan Shane Lewis return for their second season as hosts. Bruno Feldeisen and Kyla Kennaley return for their fifth and third seasons respectively as judges.

Bakers

Results summary

Episodes
 Baker eliminated
 Star Baker
 Winner

Episode 1: Cake
For their first signature challenge, the bakers were given two hours to create a decorated pound cake in any flavour of their choice.  For the technical challenge, the bakers had an hour and 45 minutes to make 20 lamingtons, with light, fluffy sponge layers, raspberry jam to hold the layers together, and covered with a layer of chocolate glaze and desiccated coconut.  For the showstopper, the bakers had three hours and 30  minutes to make a fault line cake - a cake with a decorative crack that creates the illusion of what is within the cake.

Episode 2: Cookies
For the signature challenge for this year's Cookie Week, the nine remaining bakers had two hours 15 minutes to create 12 icebox sandwich cookies, made from a stiff dough that is put in the freezer to further stiffen before it is sliced and baked. They had to ensure the dough was multi-coloured, and that when sliced, would display intricate designs. They also had to create a complementary filling that would be sandwiched between two cookies. For the technical challenge, set by Bruno, the bakers had two hours to create 20 pirouette cookies: a thin, hollow, rolled wafer cookie with a characteristic chocolate stripe, filled with a chocolate hazelnut mixture. For the showstopper challenge, the bakers were allotted 4 hours to create a cookie mosaic, which consisted of colourful cookie tiles arranged in a certain way on a cookie base.

Episode 3: Celebration
For the signature challenge, the bakers were given two hours to create eclairs for a special occasion. For the technical challenge, the bakers were given two and a half hours to make a spiderweb mirror glaze cake, with layers of sponge and mousse over a peanut base, topped with a shiny mirror finish, and applying a spiderweb pattern and tuile. For the showstopper, the bakers were give four hours to complete a wedding centrepiece made of multiple types of meringue.

Episode 4: Bread
The signature challenge saw the bakers bake a babka, a braided bread with either a sweet or savoury filling, in two and a half hours.  The technical challenge gave the bakers two and a half hours to bake 12 bolo bao, or pineapple buns, named for the characteristic topping that resembles the texture of a pineapple.  The bakers also had to make their own butter to insert into six of their twelve pineapple buns to create the bolo yau ("buttered pineapple") variant. For the showstopper, the bakers were given four and a half hours to bake and create an elaborate bread basket, with at least two kinds of bread.  The "basket" holding the baker's bread could be any shape or type of vessel, as long as it was also made of bread.

Episode 5: Pies and Tarts
In the signature challenge, the bakers had two hours to bake a sweet pie or tart inspired by a particular province of Canada.  For the technical challenge, the bakers were given two hours and fifteen minutes to bake 14 pastéis de nata, Portuguese egg custard tarts. In the showstopper challenge, the bakers needed to produce two-tiered hand-raised pies using hot water crust pastry with two distinct flavours and at least two layers within the pie in four and half hours.

Episode 6: Caramel
For the first ever caramel signature challenge, the bakers had to make florentines with tempered chocolate, with 12 each in two different flavours for a total of 24 biscuits, in two hours. In the technical challenge, the bakers had an hour and 45 minutes to make a baker's dozen of doughnuts made of a yeast-based dough, with a caramel praline pastry cream filling and caramel glaze with praline topping.  For the showstopper challenge, the bakers had four hours to bake a caramel layer cake of any design and flavour as long as caramel was the featured element.

Episode 7: Patisserie
For the signature challenge, the bakers had two hours and forty-five minutes to bake 16 vol-au-vents with two different fillings. For the technical challenge, the bakers had two hours to make a baba au rhum without a mixer. For the showstopper challenge, the bakers had four hours to bake 36 petit fours of any design and flavour; the bakers had to bake 12 each of 3 types, each with their own respective flavours.

Episode 8: Finale
For the final Signature challenge of the season, the finalists had to create a multi-layer mousse tart in 2 hours 15 minutes, making sure the layers of their creations were distinct and well set. For the final Technical challenge, the bakers had 2 hours 45 minutes to make 10 delizie al limone, an Italian dessert composed of a sponge cake base with lemon pastry cream, lemon curd, lemon whipped cream and limoncello syrup. The last Showstopper challenge (and last challenge overall) of the season saw the finalists create a baking journey cake in 4 and a half hours; the cake had to tell a story about their evolution as bakers.

References

5
2021 Canadian television seasons